Orion Peak is a  mountain summit located in the Bulkley Ranges of the Interior Mountains in northern British Columbia, Canada.

Location

Geography
Precipitation runoff from the mountain and meltwater from the glacier drains into tributaries of the Skeena River.

Climate
Based on the Köppen climate classification, Orion Peak is located in a subarctic climate zone with cold, snowy winters, and mild summers. Temperatures can drop below −20 °C with wind chill factors below −30 °C.

Name
The mountain's name was officially adopted August 25, 1977, by the Geographical Names Board of Canada, as identified in Dick Culbert's 1964 Climbers Guide to the Coastal Ranges of British Columbia.

See also

Geography of British Columbia

References

External links
 Weather forecast: Orion Peak
 BC Parks: Seven Sisters Provincial Park
 Flickr photo: Weeskinisht Peak (left), with Orion

Two-thousanders of British Columbia
Hazelton Mountains
Range 5 Coast Land District